Michael Morrissey may refer to:

Michael Morrissey (politician) (died 1947), Irish Fianna Fáil politician
Michael W. Morrissey (born 1954), District Attorney of Norfolk County, Massachusetts
Michael Morrissey (writer) (born 1942), New Zealand poet and author
Michael T. Morrissey, United States Army general